Amangylych Ovezovich Kochumov or Amangylyç Owezowiç Koçumow (born 24 July 1965) is a Turkmen football coach and a former Soviet footballer. Current head coach of Nebitchi.

Playing career 
In 1988–1989 he played for FC Kopetdag. In 1989–1991 he played for FC Ahal.

In 1992, in the 1st round of the championship of the independent Turkmenistan has scored 5 goals to FC Sport Büzmeýin. Then, for 20 rounds he scored 22 more goals. In 1993, he played for FC Büzmeýin.

In 1994–1999 he played for FC Turan (was his captain), FC Eskawatorşik, FC Merw, FC Kopetdag.

Managing career 
Coaching career began in late 1999 in FC Ahal. In 2000 led a team Interior Ministry of Turkmenistan FC Galkan, brought team to the Ýokary Liga. Since 2001, the senior coach of Football School of the Olympic reserve of Turkmenistan and the head coach of the Junior national team.

Under the coaching of Koçumow on International Youth Games of the CIS and Baltic States in 2002 in Moscow, the National team of Turkmenistan, entered the top eight. Behind this success was awarded the title Honored coach of Turkmenistan.

In 2005, he was the acting head coach of Turkmenistan national football team. Team had only one game, in which the Turkmenistan team conceded Bahrain (0:5).

Since 2008 he has headed FC Ashgabat.

In 2011, he headed the Olympic team of Turkmenistan.

In 2015, he was appointed head coach of Turkmenistan national football team, the post combines with the work of the Olympic team. Managet national team until 2016 year. Turkmenistan national football team, Turkmenistan national under-23 football team.

In July, he was dismissed from his post as head coach of the FC Aşgabat.

In September 2019, he was appointed head coach of FC Ahal. 

In August 2020, he headed the Nebitchi team.

References

External links

Soviet footballers
Turkmenistan footballers
Living people
Turkmenistan football managers
1965 births
Sportspeople from Ashgabat
Turkmenistan national football team managers
Association football midfielders